Maristania Mengana Pérez (born 5 February 2000) is a Cuban footballer who plays as a forward for the Cuba women's national team.

International career
Mengana capped for Cuba at senior level during the 2018 CONCACAF Women's Championship (and its qualification).

References

2000 births
Living people
Cuban women's footballers
Cuba women's international footballers
Women's association football forwards
21st-century Cuban women